The Gifford and Garvald Railway was a  single-track branch railway line in East Lothian, Scotland, that ran from a junction west of Ormiston on the Macmerry Branch to  via three intermediate stations, and .

History
The line was proposed in November 1890 and the company was authorised on 3 July 1891 to construct a line of 12 miles and 200 yards. Only 9.25 miles of line was completed and opened on 14 October 1901. Run by the North British Railway from opening the line remained independent until 1923 when it became part of London and North Eastern Railway. At Pencaitland, the line served the Glenkinchie distillery. L The extension of the line to Garvald was never completed.

The line closed to passengers on 3 April 1933 when the Macmerry Branch withdrew its services. After a bridge collapse in August 1948 the section from Gifford to Humbie closed but the remaining line stayed open. On 2 May 1960 the line past Humbie closed to freight and the remaining line on 25 April 1965.

References

Notes

See also
The Smeaton railway branches of the Lothians

Bibliography

External links
 
 
 
 
 

Closed railway lines in Scotland
North British Railway
Pre-grouping British railway companies
Railway lines opened in 1901